Steponas "Stepas" Garbačiauskas (17 April 1900 – 3 August 1983) was a Lithuanian record-holding athlete, football player, sports journalist, and diplomat. He is regarded as one of the Lithuanian sports pioneers.

Garbačiauskas was a forward and captain of the first Lithuanian footballing international in 1923 against Estonia, the following year he played in the 1924 Summer Olympics, against Switzerland which they lost 0-9 and didn't advance any further, over the next couple of years he played four more ties for his country.

Garbačiauskas was buried at the Petrašiūnai Cemetery.

References

1900 births
1983 deaths
20th-century Lithuanian people
Lithuanian footballers
Lithuania international footballers
Footballers at the 1924 Summer Olympics
Olympic footballers of Lithuania
Association football forwards
Burials at Petrašiūnai Cemetery
Lithuanian emigrants to Switzerland